Yowaka River, a perennial river of the Pambula River catchment, is located in the South Coast region of New South Wales, Australia.

Course and features
Yowaka River rises on the eastern slopes of the Bold Granite Range, southeast of Wyndham and flows generally south, east, and then northeast, joined by one minor tributary before reaching its confluence with the Pambula River within Pambula Lake. The river descends  over its  course.

The Princes Highway crosses the river between Pambula and Eden via the heritage-listed Greigs Flat bridge.

See also

 Yowaka River bridge, Greigs Flat
 Rivers of New South Wales
 List of rivers of New South Wales (L–Z)
 List of rivers of Australia

References

External links
 

 

Rivers of New South Wales
South Coast (New South Wales)